Dorian N'Goma Bassinga (born 15 May 1988 in Amiens) is a former professional footballer who played as a forward. Born in France, he made one appearance for the Congo national team.

International 
N'Goma made a full international debut for the Congo national team on 12 August 2009 in a friendly against Morocco.

External links

Living people
1988 births
Republic of the Congo footballers
French footballers
Sportspeople from Amiens
French sportspeople of Republic of the Congo descent
Association football forwards
Republic of the Congo international footballers
Championnat National players
Championnat National 2 players
Championnat National 3 players
Amiens SC players
AS Beauvais Oise players
FC Mantois 78 players
Calais RUFC players
Olympique Saint-Quentin players
US Granville players
Footballers from Hauts-de-France